Christophe Lesage (born 17 November 1962) is a French former professional tennis player.

Active on tour in the 1980s, Lesage reached a career best singles ranking of 393. He featured in the qualifying draw for the 1981 Wimbledon Championships and made the second round of a Grand Prix tournament in Bordeaux in 1982. As a doubles player he was ranked as high as 193 in the world and appeared in the main draw of the French Open.

Lesage founded the "National Tennis Cup", which is the largest amateur tournament in France.

Challenger finals

Doubles: 1 (0–1)

References

External links
 
 

1962 births
Living people
French male tennis players